John Proctor House may refer to:

John Proctor House (Peabody, Massachusetts), listed on the National Register of Historic Places in Essex County, Massachusetts
John  Proctor House (Westford, Massachusetts), listed on the National Register of Historic Places in Middlesex County, Massachusetts

See also
Proctor House (disambiguation)